Archie Weldon "Buddy" Cook (March 26, 1926 – August 28, 2015) was an American professional golfer.

Cook was born in Man, West Virginia. He was a club pro at The Greenbrier from 1958 to 1972 and at Boca Raton Hotel and Club from 1956 to 1972. He played on the PGA Tour in the 1950s and on the Senior PGA Tour in the 1980s. Cook won the West Virginia Open in 1985 at the age of 59.

References

American male golfers
PGA Tour golfers
Golfers from West Virginia
The Greenbrier people
People from Logan County, West Virginia
1926 births
2015 deaths